Stranje  is a settlement in the Municipality of Šmarje pri Jelšah in eastern Slovenia. It lies southeast of Šmarje. The entire area is part of the historical Styria region. The municipality is now included in the Savinja Statistical Region.

References

External links
Stranje at Geopedia

Populated places in the Municipality of Šmarje pri Jelšah